St. John African Methodist Episcopal Church was the first church for African Americans in Nebraska, organized in North Omaha in 1867. It is located at 2402 North 22nd Street in the Near North Side neighborhood. The building is listed on the National Register of Historic Places. The building was constructed in the center of Omaha's North Side in the Prairie School architecture style. Prairie School architecture is rare, and this architectural gem in urban Nebraska is particularly unusual for being designed and built in the 1920s, after the Prairie Style's rapid loss of popularity beginning after 1914.

About
Organized in the fall of 1865, the first minister of St. John was Rev. W. T. Osborne, who was also the first African American minister in Nebraska. The first meetings being held at a private residence on Capitol Avenue and Ninth Street in present-day downtown Omaha. After worshiping for a short time on Harney Street, the church moved to Douglas and Fifteenth Streets until the summer of 1865. That year a lot was purchased on the corner of Eighteenth and Webster Streets in Near North Omaha. The original church was built for $1,000.

The longest standing member of the church was Mrs. Eliza Turner, who until her death in 1938 regularly attended St. John's for seventy years. Today St. John hosts a thriving congregation, and the church serves in a variety of capacities to the surrounding community.

Pastors
Rev. J. H. Hubbard, 1866 to 1868
Rev. W. B. Ousley, 1868 to 1869
W. L. Harrod, 1869 to 1870
William Sexton, 1870 to 1871
G. W. Gaines, 1871 to 1873
J. W. Braxton, 1873 to 1875
B. F. Watson, 1875 to 1876
J. A. Fouche, 1876 to 1878

Architecture

St. John's has been housed in three different churches. The second church was located at North 25th and Grant Streets, and was notably designed by Omaha's first African American architect, Clarence W. Wigington, which was built around the turn of the century.

When the congregation outgrew that building, they located a new place to build at 2402 North 22nd Street, St. John A.M.E. Church building was designed by local architect Frederick S. Stott in 1921 in the Prairie School style. In 1947 an auditorium was added, and additional rooms were finished in 1956. The building is remarkable for its reflection of the progressive attitude of its congregation at a time when traditional values in religious architecture were prevalent. The building is recognized as an important contribution to the Prairie School style, and was added to the National Register of Historic Places in May 1980.

Notable members 

St. John's has been host to several members who are notable in local and national history. They include:
 Ophelia Clenlans, civil rights leader in Omaha
 Harrison J. Pinkett, the first University trained lawyer in Nebraska and a civil rights leader in Omaha
 W. H. C. Stephenson, a doctor and civil rights leader in Omaha

See also
History of North Omaha, Nebraska
Architecture of North Omaha, Nebraska
Black church
 List of churches in Omaha, Nebraska

References

External links
St. John AME webpage on the official African Methodist Episcopal Church website.
Modern photo

20th-century Methodist church buildings in the United States
African-American history in Omaha, Nebraska
African Methodist Episcopal churches
Churches in Omaha, Nebraska
Clarence W. Wigington church buildings
History of North Omaha, Nebraska
Landmarks in North Omaha, Nebraska
Methodist churches in Nebraska
19th-century Methodist church buildings in the United States
National Register of Historic Places in Omaha, Nebraska
Prairie School architecture in Nebraska
Churches on the National Register of Historic Places in Nebraska
Churches completed in 1921
Religious organizations established in 1865
1865 establishments in Nebraska Territory